Pseudothonalmus woodleyi is a species of beetle in the family Cerambycidae. It was described by Lingafelter, Micheli and Hugh in 2004.

References

Heteropsini
Beetles described in 2004